Gerry Rogers (born 1956) is a Canadian documentary filmmaker and politician. She was leader of the Newfoundland and Labrador New Democratic Party from 2018 until 2019. She served in the Newfoundland and Labrador House of Assembly as NDP MHA for the electoral district of St. John’s Centre from 2011 to 2019. She became the party's leader after winning the April 2018 leadership election. She resigned as party leader prior to the 2019 provincial election and did not seek re-election.

Background
Rogers was born in Corner Brook, Newfoundland, to Leo Rogers from St. John's and Philomena Coles from Port Saunders. Leo joined the army, and the family moved to Montreal, then to Toronto, Winnipeg and Germany. They eventually returned to St. John’s in 1979, where Rogers completed a bachelor of social work at Memorial University of Newfoundland. Rogers worked at the St. John’s Women’s Centre, where she helped establish the first transition house for battered women.

In 1982, she moved to Montreal to make documentary films at the National Film Board's Studio D, the only state funded women’s filmmaking unit in the world. Rogers made films with Studio D for 10 years. In 1992, she returned to St. John’s and founded Augusta Productions, and directed several international award-winning films including My Left Breast, a documentary about her own battle with breast cancer. Augusta Productions produces low-budget, POV, activist documentaries bringing viewers to the hearts and lives of people from every nook and cranny of society. The films work to uncover the joy and strength and resilience of people in difficult situations, celebrating and broadcasting their voices.

Openly lesbian, Rogers is the partner of social worker and businessperson Peg Norman. In honour of her role as a significant builder of LGBT culture and history in Canada, a portrait of Rogers by artist Claire Priddle was added to the Canadian Lesbian and Gay Archives' National Portrait Collection in 2003.

Rogers became a marriage commissioner in 2005 in response to the many marriage commissioners who resigned after being told that they must perform same-sex marriages or resign from their positions.

Politics
Rogers was elected to the Newfoundland and Labrador House of Assembly in the 2011 provincial election, representing the district of St. John’s Centre as a member of the New Democratic Party. She was the first openly gay politician ever elected to the provincial legislature. She was re-elected in the 2015 provincial election.

In 2017, Rogers announced her intentions to run for leader of the provincial NDP, following the resignation of Earle McCurdy. At the leadership convention on April 8, 2018, Rogers was elected leader with two-thirds of the vote. Rogers is the first openly LGBT person to lead a political party in Newfoundland and Labrador.

On February 12, 2019, Rogers announced she would be stepping down as leader and not seeking re-election in Newfoundland's upcoming election. On March 5, 2019, Alison Coffin was acclaimed as NDP leader. Rogers retired from the House of Assembly at its dissolution for the 2019 provincial election, which was held on May 16.

Electoral record

|-

|NDP
|Gerry Rogers
|align="right"|2,569
|align="right"|54.44
|align="right"|
|-

|-

|}

Films 

2009 Ferron: Girl on a Road 
2000 My Left Breast 
1997 Kathleen Shannon: On Film, Feminism and Other Dreams 
1994 The Vienna Tribunal 
1991 Safer for Women, Safer for Everyone — Director (Documentary, Council of Ontario Universities)
1990 After the Montreal Massacre 
1988 Faithful Women Assistant — Director (7 x 1 hour doc series, NFB/VISION TV)
1987 To a Safer Place — Producer (Documentary Series, NFB)
1986-87  Children of War  Double voix/First Take/Double Take  Thin Dreams  Beyond Memory/Nouvelle memoire

Les enfants de la guerre

— Program Producer (Documentaries, NFB)

1987 The Impossible Takes A Little Longer
1987 Le vent dans les voiles
1987 Doctor, Lawyer, Indian Chief
1987 L’Avenir entre nos mains  — Program Producer (Documentaries, NFB)
1986 Sylvie’s Story
1986 A Safe Distance
1986 Si jamais tu pars
1986 J’Osais pas rien dire
1986 Fallait que ca change  — Program Producer/(Documentaries, NFB)
1984 Head Start: Meeting the Computer Challenge
1984 L’Ordinateur en tete  — Program Producer (Documentaries, NFB)
1983 Attention Women At Work
1983 Femmes au travail  — Program Producer (Documentaries, NFB)
1983 Moving On  — Program Producer/Producer (Documentaries NFB)

Themes 
Breast Cancer, Feminism, LGBTQ+ Community, LGBTQ+ Activism, Violence Against Women.

Frequent collaborators 
Kathleen Shannon, Ginny Stikeman, Terre Nash, Nicole Hubert.

Awards and honours 
Portrait in the Canadian Lesbian and Gay Archives’ national Portrait collection, Gemini Award for My Left Breast (2001), Gold at HotDocs for My Left Breast

 2001, Won Gemini Award for 'Best History/Biography Documentary Program'''
 2001, Won 'Audience Award' at Dallas OUT TAKES Lesbian and Gay Film Festival 2001, Won 'Best Documentary' at Dallas OUT TAKES Lesbian and Gay Film Festival 2001, Won 'Outstanding Direction' at Dallas OUT TAKES Lesbian and Gay Film Festival 2001, Won 'Best Canadian Film or Video' at Inside Out Film and Video Festival 2002, Won Audience Award for 'Best Documentary Film' at Boulder Gay and Lesbian Film Festival Leadership for Women’s Health in Atlantic Canada Rogers was a 1995 Recipient of the CTV Fellowship for Banff and a resident of the Canadian Film Centre, Writing and Producing for TV program. 
 1999, completed the Women In The Director’s Chair program in Banff.''

See also
 List of female film and television directors
 List of lesbian filmmakers
 List of LGBT-related films directed by women

References

External links
 Augusta Productions
  Gerry Rogers at Queer Media Database Canada-Quebec

1956 births
Living people
21st-century Canadian politicians
21st-century Canadian women politicians
Canadian documentary film directors
Canadian women film directors
LGBT film directors
LGBT producers
Female Canadian political party leaders
Lesbian politicians
Canadian LGBT people in provincial and territorial legislatures
Film directors from Newfoundland and Labrador
Leaders of the Newfoundland and Labrador NDP/CCF
Newfoundland and Labrador political party leaders
Newfoundland and Labrador New Democratic Party MHAs
Politicians from St. John's, Newfoundland and Labrador
Women MHAs in Newfoundland and Labrador
People from Corner Brook
National Film Board of Canada people
Canadian Film Centre alumni
Canadian expatriates in Germany
Activists from Newfoundland and Labrador
Canadian women documentary filmmakers
21st-century Canadian LGBT people